Douglas Busch (born 1951) is an American photographer, inventor, teacher, and architectural designer known for using the world's largest portable view cameras and negatives to produce the world's largest photographic contact prints. His photography encompasses an array of subjects, including landscapes, cityscapes, nudes, portraits, and color, and is in the collections of major institutions such as the J. Paul Getty Museum, the Smithsonian Institution, Los Angeles County Museum of Art, and the Museum of Contemporary Art in Los Angeles. Busch's imaginative architectural work and drought-tolerant landscape designs have attracted celebrity clientele and have been featured in the Los Angeles Times, Robb Report, Western Interiors and Design, Open House, and Distinctive Homes. His dedication to the principles of healthy design and sustainable building practices led him to launch pH Living: Healthy Housing Systems, with the goal of providing homes for people who suffer from environmental allergies and chemical sensitivities. He also developed a vertical herb and vegetable production system called Farm in a Box.

Early life and education
Busch was born in Miami Beach, Florida, to Jewish parents William Goldworn and Enid Gottlieb Goldworn. He was a photographer for his high school newspaper. At the University of Illinois, he majored in cinematography, photography, and graphic design; served as president of the photo-cine co-op; and participated in a newly created independent study program.

Career
After graduating from the University of Illinois in 1970, Busch moved to Carmel, California, where he worked as an assistant to Morley Baer and Al Weber. He assisted Ansel Adams on Portfolio VI, washing prints. He assisted his mentor, Al Weber, on workshops throughout the Four Corners area.

Busch took a job with Finlay Enterprises, a division of Seligman and Latz. He worked in the diamond department and then was promoted to assistant to the fine jewelry department before being placed in the Globe Store in Scranton, Pennsylvania, where he ran the leased fine jewelry department. He received his diamond degree in 1973 from the Gemological Institute of America, and moved to Rockford, Illinois, to work in the family jewelry business, Busch Jewelers.

Busch published his first photography portfolio, Portfolio I, in 1974. In 1986, he left the jewelry business to pursue photography and established De Golden Busch Inc., a design and manufacturing company of SuperLarge™ cameras, lenses, film holders, print washers, and accessories. Over the next 50 years, Busch worked on numerous photographic series.

In the 1980s, he taught at the Victor School in Victor, Colorado, and produced the Victor Portfolio of ten 12x20" photographic contact prints, the Denver Portfolio, and the North Central IL Portfolio. His work was exhibited at the Rockford Art Museum, the Fallen Angels Project, and 510 E. State Street Gallery.

Busch moved to Los Angeles in 1992. That year, he produced his first book, "In Plain Sight," which received an award for the best book of the year from a small publisher. In 1994, he returned to the University of Illinois for one year of postgraduate study of photography, during which produced the Farmlands Project. During this time Busch traveled throughout the United States and Europe, partaking in visiting artist programs, teaching workshops, and lecturing.

Busch and his wife, Lori, started the No-Strings Foundation, a 501(c)(3) grant-making organization based in Malibu, California, in May 2005. Its primary mission was to provide direct financial support to individual photographers in the United States.

Busch began to design and build houses in the mid-2000s. He has completed over 30 projects to date. In 2009, he started ecoTECH Design Studio to design and build sustainable architecture and landscapes, to educate the public through the creation of the ecoPARK "Greenposium," and to design and build sustainable low-carbon products to reduce waste and grow food.

In 2011, Busch started pH Living: Healthy Housing Systems. Working with Lawrence Gust, a certified building biologist and chairman of the board of bau-Biologie and Ecology USA, Busch developed a healthy housing system for people who suffer from environmental allergies and chemical sensitivities and as a healthier alternative for people in general. He spoke at Pratt & Whitney Rocketdyne’s international Ninth Annual Forum of the In2:InThinking Network in April 2010 on the importance of saving our planet for our children and future generations.

Selected solo exhibitions

2019 	Mannheim Museum of Art, Mannheim, Germany: Zuma Foam, Smart Phone Symposium
2019 	Bakersfield Museum of Art, Bakersfield, CA: Platinum Photographs
2015 	Carnegie Museum of Art, Oxnard, CA: Zuma Foam
2013 	Museum der stadt, Dresden, Germany
2012 	Santa Barbara Museum of Art, Santa Barbara, CA: Scene on the Street
2010 	Gallery 169, Santa Monica, CA: Water
2008 	Deutscher Internisten Kongress, Wetzler, Germany 
2007 	Lumas Gallery, Berlin, Germany 
2006 	Art Moscow, Russia 
2006 	Caprice Horn Gallery, Berlin, Germany: Silent Waves
2006 	Dortort Center for Creativity in the Arts, UCLA, Los Angeles, CA
2006 	Vertretung des Landes Rheinland-Pfalz und der Europaischen Union, Berlin, Germany: Vestiges
2006 	Mainz Museum, Mainz, Germany: Vestiges
2006 	Museum fuer Europaische Gartenbaukunst, Dūsseldorf, Germany: Italian Gardens
2006 	Landes Museum Koblenz, Festung Ehrenbreitstein, Germany: Vestiges 
2005 	Hack Museum, Ludwigshafen, Germany: Retrospective 
2005 	Maison de l'Archéologie, Niederbronn-les-Bains, France: Vestiges
2005 	Buró Trifels, Annweiler am Trifels, Germany: Vestiges
2005 	Dortort Center for Creativity in the Arts, UCLA, Los Angeles, CA
2000 	Focus Gallery, Carmel, CA
1999 	Mannheim City Gallery, Mannheim, Germany 
1999 	Group V, Braunfeld, Germany
1998 	Cedar Rapids Museum of Art, Cedar Rapids, IA
1998 	Group V, Braunfeld, Germany
1997 	Photo Classics Gallery, Munich, Germany 
1997 	Lotus Gallery, Salzburg, Austria
1996 	451 Gallery, Rockford, IL 
1996 	Borrone Gallery, Menlo Park, CA
1995 	Fact Gallery, Laguna Beach, CA 
1995 	Linderman Gallery, Germany
1994 	G.Ray Hawkins Gallery, Santa Monica, CA 
1994 	X-ibit Gallery, Los Angeles, CA
1992 	Steven Cohen Gallery, Los Angeles, CA
1991 	Earl McGrath Gallery, Los Angeles, CA
1990 	Art Services, San Francisco, CA 
1990 	X-ibit Gallery, Los Angeles, CA
1989 	James Madison University, Harrisonburg, VA
1989 	City Hall, Rockford, IL
1989 	Weiss-Morris Gallery, Rockford, IL
1989 	Gallery Ten, Rockford, IL
1988 	Illinois State Museum, Springfield, IL
1988 	Freeport Art Museum, Freeport, IL
1988 	Rockford Art Museum, Rockford, IL
1988 	Union League Club, Chicago, IL
1988 	JR. Kortman Gallery, Rockford, IL
1987 	Ida Public Library, Belvidere, IL 
1987 	Denver Chamber of Commerce, Denver, CO
1987 	United Banks of Colorado, Denver, CO
1986 	Florissant Valley College, St. Louis, MO 
1986 	Carson-Sapiro Gallery, Denver, CO
1986 	Fermilabs, Chicago, IL
1986 	A-Space Gallery, Madison, WI
1986 	University of Maine, Portland, ME
1985 	Burpee Art Museum, Rockford, IL 
1985 	Viterbo College, LaCrosse, WI
1984 	Tracy Felix Gallery, Colorado Springs, CO 
1984 	Victor School of Photography, Victor, CO

Selected group exhibitions

2019 	Biennale für aktuelle Fotografie, Reiss-Engelhorn-Museen, Mannheim, Germany: Smart as Photography
2013 	Los Angeles County Museum of Art, Los Angeles, CA: The Vernon Collection
2013 	Rockford Museum of Art, Rockford, Illinois: Through the Ages: 100 years of RAM
2012 	Lumas Galleries; Hamburg, Germany; Stuttgart, Germany; and Paris, France: Horizons
2009 	Tarryn Teresa Gallery, Los Angeles, CA
2009 	Dogtown Station, Venice, CA: artHAUS 2009
2008 	University of Indiana, Bloomington, IN
2007 	Rustic Canyon, CA: Breaking the Waves 
2002 	Cedar Rapids Art Museum, Cedar Rapids, IA: A Century of Photography
2000 	Pasadena City College, Pasadena, CA
1989 	Art in the Embassies, Washington, DC
1989 	Busch Gallery, Rockford, IL
1988 	Smithsonian Institution, Washington, DC 
1988 	Art Institute, Chicago, IL
1987 	Camera Obscura Gallery, Denver, CO 
1986 	US Department of State, Washington, DC 
1985 	The Lloyd Gallery, Spokane, WA
1985 	The Architectural Center, Chicago, IL

Museum collections 

Carnegie Museum of Art, Oxnard, CA
Danforth Museum of Art, Framingham, MA
Denver Art Museum, Denver, CO
Fort Lauderdale Museum of Art, Fort Lauderdale, FL
George Eastman House, Rochester, NY
Grinnell College Art Museum, Grinnell, IA
Illinois State Library, Springfield, IL
J. Paul Getty Museum, Los Angeles, CA
Los Angeles County Museum of Art, Los Angeles, CA
Museum of Contemporary Art, Atlanta, GA
MOCA, Los Angeles, CA
Museum of Photographic Arts, San Diego, CA
Portland Museum of Art, Portland, ME
University of California, Santa Cruz, CA

Corporate collections 

The Best Company
Cedars-Sinai Hospital
City Club-Atlanta, Georgia
Eastman Kodak Corp.
General Litho
Irvine Corporation
Jannes Arts Publishing Co.
Kodak Corporation
Liebovich Steel Corp.
McDonalds Corp. 
Polaroid Corporation
Rodenstock Optical Corp.
Seven Jeans 
St. Frances Hospital 
YWCA Los Angeles Education Building
Ziffren and Ziffren

Books 

2019 	Appropriated Berlin: Dead Like You (Paper Mirror Press, Chicago, IL)
2019 	China Observations: Interested Indifference (Paper Mirror Press, Chicago, IL)
2019 	Holistic Architecture: Trancas Project (Paper Mirror Press, Chicago, IL)
2019 	Much Ado About Nothing: Notes in Passing (Paper Mirror Press, Chicago, IL)
2019 	Suggestive Nature (Paper Mirror Press, Chicago, IL)
2019 	Zuma Foam, with poems by Florence Weinberger (Paper Mirror Press, Chicago, IL)
2012 	Scene on the Street (Nazraeli Press / Santa Barbara Museum of Art, Paso Robles, CA)
2009 	Appropriated Berlin, Limited Edition of 10 original photographs and stand
2008 	Silent Waves, Limited Edition of 10 original photographs and stand
2007 	Silent Waves, Limited Edition (The Photo Department, Malibu, CA)
2006 	California Gardens (Wade Publishing, London, UK)
2006 	Cruising Miami (Braus Editions, Germany, and Paper Mirror Press, Chicago, IL)
2006 	Vestiges (Braus Editions, Germany, and Paper Mirror Press, Chicago, IL)
2006 	Flesh as Canvas (Braus Editions, Germany, and Paper Mirror Press, Chicago, IL)
2006 	Fallen Angels (Braus Editions, Germany, and Paper Mirror Press, Chicago, IL)
2006 	Self Subject (Braus Editions, Germany, and Paper Mirror Press, Chicago, IL)
2006 	Italian Gardens (Braus Editions, Germany)
2005 	Retrospective: From Miami to Malibu (Braus Editions, Germany)
2005 	Vestiges (Lindemanns Verlay, Stuttgart, Germany) 
1994 	Tides in Time (The Photo Department, Santa Monica, CA)
1992 	In Plain Sight (The Photo Department, Rockford, IL)

Selected Photograph and Article Publications 

British Journal of Photography
Camera Arts
Chicago Tribune
Darkroom Photography
Die Rheinpfalz (Germany)
Fortune
Foto and Labor (Germany) 
HGTV Design Challenge
International Photo Techniques
Modern Photography
New York Times
Photo District News
Photo Eidolo (Greece)
Photo Vision
Popular Photography
Robb Report
Western Interiors

References

External links
Official website

American photographers
21st-century American architects
American designers
1951 births
Living people
University of Illinois at Urbana–Champaign School of Art and Design alumni
People from Miami Beach, Florida
Architects from Florida
Artists from Florida